Monolistra is a genus of isopod crustaceans in the family Sphaeromatidae. Its members are restricted to countries of the former Yugoslavia and neighbouring Italy. It contains the following subgenera and species, four of which are listed as vulnerable (VU) or endangered (EN) on the IUCN Red List:
Microlistra Gerstaecker, 1856
Monolistra bolei (Sket, 1960) –  
Monolistra calopyge Sket, 1982 –  
Monolistra pretneri Sket, 1964 – 
Monolistra schottlaenderi Stammer, 1930 –  
Monolistra sketi (Deeleman-Reinhold, 1971) – 
Monolistra spinosa (Racovitza, 1929) – 
Monolistra spinosissima (Racovitza, 1929) –  
Monolistra Gerstaecker, 1856
Monolistra monstruosa Sket, 1970 – 
Monolistrella Sket, 1964
Monolistra velkovrhi Sket, 1960
Pseudomonolistra
Monolistra bosnica Sket, 1970 – 
Monolistra hercegoviniensis Absolon, 1916 - 
Monolistra radjai Prevorcnik & Sket, 2007
Typhlosphaeroma
Monolistra bericum (Fabiani, 1901) – , 
Monolistra boldorii Brian, 1931 – 
Monolistra lavalensis Stoch, 1984 – 
Monolistra matjasici Sket, 1965 – 
Monolistra pavani Arcangeli, 1942 – , 
Monolistra racovitzai Strouhal, 1928 – ,

References

Sphaeromatidae
Taxonomy articles created by Polbot